The 2005 UAW-Ford 500 was a NASCAR Nextel Cup Series race that took place on October 2, 2005 at Talladega Superspeedway in Talladega, Alabama. It was the 29th race of the 2005 NASCAR Nextel Cup Series and the third in the ten-race, season-ending Chase for the Nextel Cup. Dale Jarrett of Robert Yates Racing would win the race.

Until the 2008 Aaron's 499, this was the last time a Hendrick Motorsports car did not win at Talladega.

Entry list

Qualifying

Race recap 
Pole sitter Elliott Sadler led the first lap of the race but soon lost the lead to his teammate Dale Jarrett in turn 1 when Jarrett got a push from Tony Stewart. Stewart then barely edged out Jarrett to lead lap 2 but soon Jarrett took it back by lap 3 then by Sadler for the next 5 laps. The first caution came out on lap 20 with that being the first big one of the race collecting 8 cars. Pole sitter Elliott Sadler got tapped from behind by Jimmie Johnson which sent Sadler around in front of Johnson, Dale Earnhardt Jr., and Mark Martin. Martin spun down and clipped Michael Waltrip which sent Waltrip flipping over twice with the rear axle hanging out of his car. The cars involved were Sadler, Johnson, Earnhardt Jr., Martin, Waltrip, Mike Skinner, Mike Bliss (who spun late trying to avoid the wreck), and Joe Nemechek. The race got back going on lap 28 with Matt Kenseth leading the race. The second caution came out on lap 34. Due to the big one that happened 14 laps earlier, Johnson's car got repaired with tape. However, the left rear fender was still rubbing on the tire and just past the start-finish line, Johnson's left rear tire exploded shredding debris all over the racetrack. During pit stops under caution, Kyle Petty was trying to enter his pit when he got tapped by Bobby Labonte sending Petty spinning into Casey Mears' pit. Mears' crews ducked behind the wall as they were ready for Mears to enter in the box to avoid getting hit by Petty's car. Fortunately, no one was injured. The race got back going again by lap 38. On lap 57, the third caution came out for a multi-car crash off of turn 2. Mike Bliss blew a left rear tire and spun collecting Jeff Green, J. J. Yeley, and Kerry Earnhardt with Travis Kvapil hitting the wall trying to avoid Bliss. The race got back going again on lap 61, but not for long.

On lap 65, the second big one would occur collecting another 8 cars. Ryan Newman turned Casey Mears around right in front of the field. Rusty Wallace trying to avoid Mears then hooked Scott Riggs in the right rear sending Riggs head on into the outside wall flipping him over. Riggs' car then tumbled multiple times past the start-finish line with Jeff Burton nearly running into him head on while he was tumbling. Burton steered to the right and barely clipped Riggs while he was tumbling. Fortunately, Riggs was ok. The cars involved were Mears, Wallace, Riggs, Burton, Mike Wallace, Greg Biffle, Jeff Gordon, and Jimmie Johnson. The 5th caution came out on lap 77 when Kyle Busch got loose in turn 4 sending Busch into the outside wall. The 6th caution came out when Kyle's older brother Kurt Busch blew a right front tire and hit the wall in turn 4 while leading the race. The next 2 cautions came out for debris. With 7 laps to go, Matt Kenseth took the lead and it looked like he was gonna take the victory. But with 4 laps to go, Ken Schrader blew a tire and crashed in turn 4 bringing out the 9th caution and setting up a green-white-checkered finish. Kenseth took the lead and took the white flag with Tony Stewart making a move to the inside. Coming from 5th place, Dale Jarrett passed Kenseth and Stewart in turns 1 and 2 to take the lead on the final lap. Down the backstretch, Kyle Petty got hooked and crashed hard into the inside wall bringing out the 10th and final caution. Jarrett was the leader at the moment of caution and took home his 32nd and final career Cup Series victory and his first since the 2002 Pepsi 400 presented by Farmer Jack at Michigan. Tony Stewart, Matt Kenseth, Ryan Newman, and Carl Edwards rounded the top 5 and Brian Vickers, Sterling Marlin, Kurt Busch, Joe Nemechek, and Kevin Harvick rounding the top 10. Meanwhile, Kyle Petty, despite a severely damaged racecar, still wanted to finish the race. While Jarrett was celebrating with the crowd, Petty followed Jarrett after Jarrett passed him off turn 4 struggling to get the car to the finish. Petty's car was able to cross the start-finish line to the cheers of the crowd finishing in 24th 2 laps down and was not handed a DNF.

Race results

References

UAW-Ford 500
UAW-Ford 500
NASCAR races at Talladega Superspeedway